Tonyville is a census-designated place (CDP) in Tulare County, California. The 2010 United States census reported Tonyville's population was 316.

Geography
According to the United States Census Bureau, the CDP covers an area of 0.05 square miles (0.13 km), all of it land.

It's located north of Lindsay, California.

Main attractions of Tonyville are a convenient store that is near the northernmost part of the town and that Rocky Hill is about a mile north.

Demographics
At the 2010 census Tonyville had a population of 316. The racial makeup of Tonyville was 178 (56.3%) White, 0 (0.0%) African American, 0 (0.0%) Native American, 12 (3.8%) Asian, 0 (0.0%) Pacific Islander, 115 (36.4%) from other races, and 11 (3.5%) from two or more races. Hispanic or Latino of any race were 286 people (90.5%).

The whole population lived in households, no one lived in non-institutionalized group quarters and no one was institutionalized.

There were 63 households, 45 (71.4%) had children under the age of 18 living in them, 35 (55.6%) were opposite-sex married couples living together, 13 (20.6%) had a female householder with no husband present, 11 (17.5%) had a male householder with no wife present.  There were 6 (9.5%) unmarried opposite-sex partnerships, and 2 (3.2%) same-sex married couples or partnerships. 1 households (1.6%) were one person and 1 (1.6%) had someone living alone who was 65 or older. The average household size was 5.02.  There were 59 families (93.7% of households); the average family size was 4.88.

The age distribution was 104 people (32.9%) under the age of 18, 44 people (13.9%) aged 18 to 24, 98 people (31.0%) aged 25 to 44, 55 people (17.4%) aged 45 to 64, and 15 people (4.7%) who were 65 or older.  The median age was 27.3 years. For every 100 females, there were 129.0 males.  For every 100 females age 18 and over, there were 120.8 males.

There were 68 housing units at an average density of 1,346.6 per square mile, of the occupied units 23 (36.5%) were owner-occupied and 40 (63.5%) were rented. The homeowner vacancy rate was 0%; the rental vacancy rate was 4.8%.  120 people (38.0% of the population) lived in owner-occupied housing units and 196 people (62.0%) lived in rental housing units.

References

Census-designated places in Tulare County, California
Census-designated places in California